"Squidward Nose" is a song by American rapper and singer Cupcakke. It was independently released on January 11, 2019. The song refers to the character Squidward Tentacles from the Nickelodeon TV series SpongeBob SquarePants.

In the song, Cupcakke laments her sexual partner, saying, "His dick smaller than my toes / I'd rather ride Squidward nose." The song received attention through TikTok for its raunchy lyrics.

Background
The song was originally planned to be called "Pinocchio Nose" but the singer changed the character to Squidward when she realized that the Pinocchio character is a child.

Music video
A music video was released on February 21, 2019, and features comedian John Early. The music video features Cupcakke as a siren and Early as a diver. Squidward also appears at the end, where Cupcakke ends up riding his nose as stated in the lyrics. It is unknown if Squidward makes Cupcakke cum.

Reception
MTV News posted a somewhat nonplussed response to the video, calling it "equal parts SpongeBob SquarePants and sex". The singer is "immediately over the top from the opening moments... her half-laugh/half-smile expression lets you know that you're in for a wild ride." In closing, they say, "With this kind of work ethic and commitment to risque subject matters, there's literally no telling what the rapper could be planning next."

References 

2019 singles
2019 songs
Cupcakke songs
Songs about fictional male characters
SpongeBob SquarePants

Songs about casual sex
Songs about fictional characters
Dirty rap songs